Ephedra nevadensis, commonly known as Nevada ephedra, gray ephedra, Mormon tea and Nevada jointfir, is a species of gymnosperm native to dry areas of western North America.

Its range extends west to California and Oregon, east to Texas, and south to Baja California, including areas of the Great Basin, Colorado plateau and desert Southwest.  It is found in rocky and sandy soils, generally in areas without trees.

Reproduction
Nevada ephedra is wind-pollinated, with male plants growing in dryer areas and female plants growing in wetter ones, an arrangement which is believed to increase the production of seed.  Cones mature and pollination occurs in March to June, with seeds ripening in May to August, although seeds are not produced every year.  In the wild, seeds are often spread by rodents, and for cultivation, seeds can readily be collected and sown.  The plant can also be propagated via transplants and cuttings.

More than other North American Ephedra species, it is a significant forage plant.  It is grazed upon by mule deer (Odocoileus hemionus), pronghorn (Antilocapra americana), and desert bighorn sheep (Ovis canadensis) as well as domestic sheep.

Uses
Ephedra nevadensis was used for food and medicine by indigenous people and for tea by Mormons.  Currently, its biggest use is as forage for sheep and cattle (it is not as good for horses), and for habitat restoration.  It is sometimes grown for ornamental purposes. Among the Zuni people an infusion of the whole plant, except for the root, is taken for syphilis. They also use it to make a tea-like beverage.

References

External links

Jepson Manual Treatment: Ephedra nevadensis
USDA Plants Profile
Forest Service Fire Ecology
Ephedra nevadensis — U.C. Photo gallery

nevadensis
North American desert flora
Flora of Baja California
Flora of the Southwestern United States
Flora of the California desert regions
Flora of the Great Basin
Flora of the Chihuahuan Desert
Flora of the Sonoran Deserts
Natural history of the Mojave Desert
Plants used in Native American cuisine
Plants used in traditional Native American medicine